The Wallis and Futuna Rugby Committee (French: Comité de Rugby Wallis et Futuna, —or officially: Comité Territorial de Rugby Wallis et Futuna) is a committee under the umbrella of the French Rugby Federation which is the governing body for rugby union within Wallis and Futuna.

It is an associate member of the Oceania Rugby, which is the regional governing body for Oceania, but it is not affiliated with World Rugby in its own right.

National teams

Wallis and Futuna first played international 15-a-side rugby in 1966 at the South Pacific Games (as it was then called), but has since switched focus onto playing rugby sevens. The Wallis and Futuna team has competed at 7-a-side rugby tournaments in recent Pacific Games.

See also
 Rugby union in Wallis and Futuna
 Wallis and Futuna national rugby union team (sevens)
 Wallis and Futuna national rugby union team, currently inactive

External links
  Wallis and Futuna on OceaniaRugby.com
 Comité de Rugby de Wallis et Futuna on aslagnyrugby.net

Reference list

Rugby union in Wallis and Futuna
Rugby union governing bodies in Oceania